3 Musketeers is a chocolate bar made in the United States and Canada by Mars, Incorporated. It is a candy bar consisting of chocolate-covered, fluffy, whipped mousse. It is a lighter chocolate bar similar to the global Milky Way bar and similar to the American version Milky Way bar only smaller and without the caramel topping. The 3 Musketeers Bar was the third brand produced and manufactured by M&M/Mars, introduced in 1932. Originally, it had three pieces in one package, flavored chocolate, strawberry and vanilla; hence the name, which was derived from the 1844 novel The Three Musketeers by Alexandre Dumas. Rising costs and wartime restrictions on sugar saw the phasing out of the vanilla and strawberry pieces to leave only the more popular chocolate. Costing five cents when it was introduced, it was marketed as one of the largest chocolate bars available, one that could be shared by friends.

To mark the 75th anniversary of the introduction of the candy bar, Mars introduced 3 Musketeers Mint, the first brand extension, in August 2007. Also in 2007, Mars produced a limited-edition "Autumn Minis Mix" 3 Musketeers. It featured French Vanilla, Mocha Cappuccino and Strawberry. This was followed by Cherry 3 Musketeers for 2008, and Raspberry 3 Musketeers and Orange 3 Musketeers for Easter 2008. Orange was coated in milk chocolate, while the cherry and raspberry were coated with dark chocolate. In 2019, Mars released their latest flavor, the 3 Musketeers Birthday Cake. It comes in two sizes: the Share Size bar and Miniatures Stand Up Pouch.

Manufacturing
The candy is made of a whipped mousse covered with milk chocolate. The nougat chocolate center is first formed into very large slabs, which are cut to size, and after the centers are formed they are coated with milk chocolate through a process called "enrobing" wherein the centers pass through a continuous flowing vertical "sheet" of chocolate while, at the same time, a rotating, chocolate-covered wheel beneath the mesh belt coats the base of the bar. The bar is then cooled and prepared for wrapping. The candy is made in Chicago, Illinois; Elizabethtown, Pennsylvania; and Newmarket, Ontario.

The nougat chocolate center is made by whipping egg whites until they are light and frothy. Sugar syrup is then added, stabilizing the foam and creating "frappé." Other flavoring ingredients are then added to the frappé to create specific flavors.

Marketing
3 Musketeers was advertised on television on the 1950s-era Howdy Doody show, along with a song that Buffalo Bob Smith encouraged children to sing.

In 1998, the bar's advertisements also featured three men dressed as the legendary Three Musketeers to market the "45% less fat" campaign. The advertising campaign was developed by Will Vinton Studios, whose previous works include the M&M's characters, The Noid and The California Raisins. The product's original slogan of "Big on Chocolate!" was expanded in these advertisements to "Big on Chocolate, Not on Fat!"

Most recently, the 3 Musketeers bar has been advertised in television spots that featured women. The candy bar is promoted as a "Nice, Light Snack" which features "45% less fat" than other chocolate bars.

3 Musketeers YouTube channel 
In 2015, Mars, Incorporated debuted a marketing campaign in the form of a YouTube channel. The campaign was developed and directed by the advertising agency Tribal Worldwide, who explained the project as an effort to establish relevancy and recognition among Generation Z. While it is not uncommon for corporations to tap into younger markets via sponsorships or deals with internet personalities such as YouTubers, Tribal Worldwide has said that they have attempted to take the concept further by developing their own such internet celebrities, as the channel is hosted by three teenagers selected for the roles, known as Emily, Buz, and G. The channel has been promoted through ads that YouTube displays before and after monetized videos on their site.

The campaign has encountered mixed reception. The first two videos posted by the channel have a 1:1 like-to-dislike ratio, and some users expressed suspicion at the concept of a corporate manufactured channel, while others expressed annoyance at the campaign's heavy use of video ads to advertise the channel on other videos. There have been many who have supported the channel, and as of March 2021, it maintained 31.6k subscribers. Many marketing insiders have expressed interest in the concept of the campaign, citing it as an example of the growth strategy of influencer marketing, whereby personalities or 'influencers' are able to more effectively advertise to an audience that trusts them than an expensive corporate advertising campaign.

Nutritional information
A standard-size 3 Musketeers bar (60 g) has  of food energy, 7 grams of total fat, and 40 grams of sugar, while the mini-size bar (serving size 41 g) has , 5 grams of total fat, and 27 grams of sugar.

International
In Europe, the 3 Musketeers brand name was used for the French version of the Curly Wurly candy bar in the 1970s and 1980s.

Flavor list 
Original 3 bar-Chocolate (chocolate, vanilla, strawberry), 1932–1945
Chocolate with filling, 1945–present
Birthday Cake, 2019
Mint, 2007
"Autumn Minis" – Cappuccino, French Vanilla and Strawberry, 2007
Cherry, 2008
Raspberry, 2008
Orange, 2008
Chocolate Strawberry Brownie, 2008
Chocolate Brownie Bar (Generation Max series)
S'Mores Brownie Bar (Generation Max series)
Truffle Crisp
Marshmallow, limited edition Minis, Easter 2011 and 2012
Coconut, 2011
Hot Chocolate with marshmallow, Christmas 2012

See also
 Milky Way (chocolate bar), the European equivalent
 List of chocolate bar brands

References

External links

Chocolate bars
Mars confectionery brands
Products introduced in 1932
Brand name confectionery
The Three Musketeers